Open House Tel Aviv (Batim MiBifnim, lit. "Houses From Within") happens over the course of a weekend annually in Tel Aviv, Israel, in which different buildings, landmarks and private residences open their doors to the general public to offer a free glimpse of architecture in the past and present, with a preview of design for the future. It is one of many Open House events that take place in cities such as London and New York City, originally started in France in 1984.

See also
openhousenewyork
Open House London
Doors Open Toronto
Doors Open Canada

External links
Official website

Culture in Tel Aviv
Tel Aviv
Tourist attractions in Tel Aviv